The following is a list of notable deaths in January 2005.

Entries for each day are listed alphabetically by surname. A typical entry lists information in the following sequence:
 Name, age, country of citizenship at birth, subsequent country of citizenship (if applicable), reason for notability, cause of death (if known), and reference.

January 2005

1
Marc Baltzan, 75, Canadian physician.
Harold Bodle, 84, English footballer (Birmingham City, Bury, Stockport County and Accrington Stanley).
Shirley Chisholm, 80, American politician, first black woman ever to serve in the U.S. Congress.
Eugene J. Martin, 66, African-American painter.
Hugh Lawson, 6th Baron Burnham, 73, British executive and peer, Deputy Speaker of the House of Lords and former deputy managing director of The Daily Telegraph.
Bob Matsui, 63, American Democratic Party member of the House of Representatives, cancer.
Dmitry Nelyubin, 33, Russian cyclist, murdered.
Patrick Denis O'Donnell, 82, Irish military historian and army officer.

2
Reine Andersson, 59, Swedish Olympic sailor 
Bernard Barrell, 85, British composer and conductor.
H. David Dalquist, 86, American inventor and chemical engineer, founder of Nordic Ware, creator of the Bundt cake pan.
Arnold Denker, 90, American chess player.
Cyril Fletcher, 91, British comedian (That's Life!).
Frank Kelly Freas, 82, American science fiction artist.
Félix Galimi, 84, Argentine Olympic fencer.
Paul Manning, 45, American television writer (ER, L.A. Law), colorectal cancer.
Ronald Ginn, 70, American former Congressman from Georgia.
Maclyn McCarty, 93, American geneticist and DNA research pioneer.
Edo Murtić, 83, Croatian painter.

3
Sir Edward Britton, 95, British trade unionist.
Paul Darragh, 51, Irish equestrian showjumper, heart failure
JN Dixit, 68, Indian national security adviser and former foreign secretary.
Will Eisner, 87, American comic book artist (The Spirit), complications following surgery.
Richard Feilden, 54, British architect.
Koo Chen-fu, 88, Chinese negotiator with the People's Republic of China, renal cancer.
Claude Meillassoux, 79, French anthropologist and economist.
Robert Gottschall, 89, American actor.
László Vadász, 56, Hungarian chess grandmaster.

4
Humphrey Carpenter, 58, British biographer and broadcaster
Guy Davenport, 77, American writer, translator, illustrator, and painter, lung cancer
Beulah Anne Georges, 81, American baseball player (AAGPBL).
Ali Al-Haidri, Iraqi governor of Baghdad province, assassinated
Frank Harary, 84, American mathematician, a foremost expert on graph theory
Robert Heilbroner, 85, American economist.
Marguerite Pearson, 72, American professional baseball player (AAGPBL)
Bud Poile, 80, Canadian professional ice hockey player, right wing for Toronto Maple Leafs and Detroit Red Wings in the 1940s and 50s, member of Hockey Hall of Fame
Alton Tobey, 90, American muralist and painter.

5
Martín Acosta y Lara, 79, Uruguayan basketball player.
Antoni Barwiński, 81, Polish football player.
Antonio Benítez-Rojo, 73, Cuban writer.
Gabrielle Daye, 93, English stage actress.
Tore Johannessen, 82, Norwegian ice hockey referee.
Charles Repenning, 82, American paleontologist and zoologist, murdered during burglary.
Danny Sugerman, 50, American music manager.

6
Vern Barberis, 76, Australian weightlifter.
Eileen Desmond, 72, Irish politician, Minister for Health and Social Welfare (1981–1982).
S. Paul Ehrlich Jr., 72, American physician, Acting Surgeon General of the United States (1973–1977).
Lois Hole, 75, Canadian politician, businesswoman, academician, professional gardener and best-selling author, Lieutenant Governor of Alberta, cancer.
Makgatho Mandela, 54, South African last surviving son of Nelson Mandela, AIDS.
Louis Robichaud, 79, Canadian former premier of New Brunswick.
Sir Nicholas Scott, 71, British politician.
Ali Shukriu, 85, Kosovan politician, Prime Minister (1963–1967) and President (1981–1982).

7
Harry Boyles, 93, American baseball player.
Pierre Daninos, 91, French novelist (The Diary of Major Thompson).
Bernard "Buddy" Diliberto, 73, American sports commentator in New Orleans, heart attack.
Rosemary Kennedy, 86, American sister of John F. Kennedy, natural causes.
Aleksandr Prokhorov, 58, Soviet footballer (Dynamo Kyiv, Spartak Moscow).

8
Oleta Kirk Abrams, 77, American activist.
Leonardo Alishan, 53, Iranian scholar.
Badja Djola, 56, American actor (Mississippi Burning, The Hurricane, The Last Boy Scout), heart attack.
Jacqueline Joubert, 83, French television announcer, producer and director, one of the first television presenters on French television.
Suvad Katana, 35, Bosnian footballer.
Aksella Luts, 99, Estonian screenwriter, actress and filmmaker.
Campbell McComas, 52, Australian comedian, writer and actor.
Song Renqiong, 95, Chinese general and politician.
David Shaw, 50, Australian scuba diver, drowned.
Warren Spears, 50, American dancer and choreographer.
Michel Thomas, 90, Polish linguist and teacher.

9
Fritz Aigner, 74, Austrian artist.
Luis Alers, 54, Puerto Rican sprinter.
Artidoro Berti, 84, Italian Olympic runner.
Gonzalo Gavira, 79, Mexican sound effects creator (The Exorcist, The Towering Inferno).
Joanne Grant, 74, American journalist and communist activist.
Koji Hashimoto, 68, Japanese film director.
Bob Mabe, 75, American baseball player.
Alan Loy McGinnis, 72, American author and Christian psychotherapist.
Michael P. Ryan, 88, United States Marine Corps major general.
Thady Ryan, 81, Irish Olympic equestrian.
Vantile Whitfield, 74, American arts administrator, Alzheimer's disease.
Alex Wu, 84, Hong Kong businessman and politician.

10
Gene Baylos, 98, American comedian.
Professeur Choron, 75, French humorist Georges Bernier.
Margherita Carosio, 96, Italian soprano.
Tommy Fine, 90, American baseball player, pitcher in Major League Baseball for the Boston Red Sox and St. Louis Browns in the 1940s and 50s.
James Forman, 76, United States former executive secretary of the Student Nonviolent Coordinating Committee, colorectal cancer.
Sir Stephen Hastings, 83, British politician, MP for Mid Bedfordshire (1960–1983).
Erwin Hillier, 93, British cinematographer.
Gordon John "Jack" Horner, 92, American sports journalist.
Princess Joséphine Charlotte of Belgium, 77, Belgian-born Princess of Belgium and Grand Duchess of Luxembourg, cancer.
Helmut Losch, 57, East German heavyweight weightlifting champion.
Jan Pieter Schotte, 76, Belgian official of the Roman Curia, cardinal since 1994.
Arthur Walworth, 101, American writer and biographer.

11
Ian Anderson, 79, Manx politician.
Spencer Dryden, 66, American drummer (Jefferson Airplane), cancer.
Jimmy Griffin, 61, American singer, guitarist, songwriter, member of 1970s rock band Bread, cancer.
Miriam Hyde, 91, Australian composer (Valley of Rocks).
Bud McCaig, 75, Canadian businessman, co-owner of the NHL's Calgary Flames.
Fabrizio Meoni, 47, Italian motorcyclist, motorcycle accident.
Jerzy Pawlowski, 72, Polish Olympic champion in fencing.
Thelma White, 94, United States actress (Reefer Madness), pneumonia.

12
John Brown, 76, New Zealand Test cricket umpire.
Kenneth Farmer, 92, Canadian Olympic ice hockey player and sports administrator.
Herbert Goldstein, 82, American physicist.
Ruth Packer, 94, British soprano, famous for playing Verdi heroines.
Amrish Puri, 72, Indian actor (Indiana Jones and the Temple of Doom, Mr. India, Gandhi), massive cerebral hemorrhage.
Jay Schulberg, 65, American advertising executive, pancreatic cancer.
Edmund S. Valtman, 90, Estonian-American Pulitzer Prize-winning political cartoonist.

13
Hunter Andrews, 83, American politician.
Earl Cameron, 89?, Canadian broadcaster and The National anchor (1959–1966).
Roland Frye, 83, American English literature professor and theologian.
Nell Rankin, 81, United States mezzo-soprano opera singer who sang with the Metropolitan Opera for many years.
Karstein Seland, 93, Norwegian politician.

14
Edwin Bélanger, 94, Canadian musician.
Ward Beysen, 63, Belgian politician and freemason.
Charles T. Booher, 45, American engineer.
George Wendell Brett, 92, American philatelist.
Frederick H. Buttel, 56, American sociologist.
Ofelia Guilmain, 83, Spanish film and stage actress, worked mostly in Mexico after the Spanish Civil War.
Charlotte MacLeod, 82, United States mystery writer.
Conroy Maddox, 92, British surrealist painter.
Rudolph Moshammer, 64, German fashion designer.
Raja Lakshmeshwar Singh, 50, Indian politician.
Jesús Soto, 81, Venezuelan kinetic artist.

15
Victoria de los Ángeles, 81, Spanish soprano.
Felix Aprahamian, 90, English music critic.
Leonid Brekhovskikh, 87, Russian scientist.
Walter Ernsting, 84, German science fiction author (Perry Rhodan).
William Hare, 69, Canadian Olympic shooter
Elizabeth Janeway, 91, United States feminist author.
Dan Lee, 35, Canadian animator (Finding Nemo, Monsters, Inc., Toy Story 2), heart failure.
Ruth Warrick, 89, American actress (Citizen Kane, All My Children, Song of the South), pneumonia.

16
Mireille Best, 61, French author.
William Brigden, 88, Canadian canoeist.
Alexander Everett, 83, English motivational consultant.
H. Bentley Glass, 98, United States biologist, known for controversial views.
Agustín González, 74, Spanish film actor.
Marjorie Williams, 47, American journalist. The Washington Post columnist and contributing editor for Vanity Fair, liver cancer.

17
Charlie Bell, 44, Australian business executive, former CEO of McDonald's, colon cancer.
Virginia Mayo, 84, United States film actress (White Heat, The Best Years of Our Lives).
Albert Schatz, 84, American microbiologist, discoverer of streptomycin.
George P. L. Walker, 78, British volcanologist.
Zhao Ziyang, 85, Chinese politician, former Chinese Communist Party General Secretary, complications of multiple strokes.

18
Gabrielle Brune, 92, British actress.
Vivian H. H. Green, 89, British priest and historian.
Kenneth Robinson, 90, British civil servant and academic.
Pez Whatley, 54, American professional wrestler.

19
Theodore W. Allen, 85, American writer.
Bill Andersen, 80, New Zealand communist and trade union leader.
Donald Beardslee, 61, American convicted murderer, executed in San Quentin State Prison, California.
Lamont Bentley, 31, American actor (Moesha) and rapper.
Kasimir Bileski, 96, Canadian philatelist.
Jens-Halvard Bratz, 84, Norwegian businessman and politician.
Carlos Cortez, 81, American artist and political activist.
K. Sello Duiker, 30, South African novelist, suicide.
Ardyth Kennelly, 92, US novelist whose books were popular in the 1940s and 50s.
Anita Kulcsár, 28, Hungarian handball player.

20
Parveen Babi, 55, Indian actress.
Ivor G. Balding, 96, American polo player.
Bogle, 40, Jamaican dancer.
Per Borten, 91, Norwegian politician, former Prime Minister of Norway.
Dick Gallagher, 49, American composer, predominantly for off-Broadway productions.
Jan Nowak-Jeziorański, 91, Polish journalist and highly decorated World War II hero, head of the Radio Free Europe Polish section.
Dame Miriam Rothschild, 96, British zoologist, entomologist and author.

21
Jacques Andrieux, 87, French World War II fighter pilot.
Reg Cudlipp, 95, British newspaper editor.
John L. Hess, 87, American journalist.
Richard Outram, 74, Canadian poet.
Don Poier, 53, United States NBA basketball announcer for the Memphis Grizzlies.
Adrianne Reynolds, 16, American teenager who was brutally murdered and made national headlines.
Neville Scott, 69, New Zealand Olympic runner.
Steve Susskind, 62, American voice-over actor.
Theun de Vries, 97, Dutch writer.

22
Harry J. Boyle, 89, Canadian broadcaster.
Sir William Deakin, 91, British World War II hero and founder of St Antony's College, Oxford.
César Gutiérrez, 61, Venezuelan baseball player, one of three players in Major League Baseball history with a 7-for-7 game.
Carlo Orelli, 110, Italian supercentenarian, oldest Italian veteran of World War I.
Patsy Rowlands, 74, British actress, known for her roles in the Carry On films, breast cancer.
William Trager, 94, American parasitologist.
Consuelo Velázquez, 88, Mexican songwriter and lyricist, and author of the enduring song "Bésame mucho".
Rose Mary Woods, 87, American politician, former secretary of Richard Nixon and key Watergate figure.

23
Harley Baldwin, 59, American developer active in New York City and Aspen, Colorado, kidney cancer.
Howard Kent Birnbaum, 72, American metallurgist.
Morys George Lyndhurst Bruce, 4th Baron Aberdare, 85, British politician and peer, former Deputy Speaker of the UK House of Lords.
Johnny Carson, 79, United States comedian and television host, emphysema.
Douglas Knight, 83, American educator, businessman, author, former president of Lawrence University and Duke University.
Warren D. Niederhauser, 87, American chemist, former president of the American Chemical Society.

24
ZerNona Black, 98, American activist on behalf of senior citizens and the elderly, natural causes.
June Bronhill, 75, Australian actress and opera, operetta and musical comedy singer, Alzheimer's disease.
Lev Saychuk, 81, Soviet Olympic fencer. 
Chalkie White, 76, English rugby union coach.
Leslie Wood, 72, English footballer.

25
Stanisław Albinowski, 81, Polish economist.
William Augustus Bootle, 102, American district judge overseeing desegregation in the American South.
Philip Johnson, 98, American architect.
Vicky LaMotta, 75, American model, ex-wife of American boxer Jake LaMotta, following open-heart surgery.
Ray Peterson, 65, American popular singer (Tell Laura I Love Her), cancer.
Max Velthuijs, 81, Dutch writer and illustrator.
Nettie Witziers-Timmer, 81, Dutch athlete.

26
Roy Fraser Elliott, 83, Canadian lawyer and philanthropist.
Peter A. Garland, 81, American politician, U.S. Representative from Maine (1961–1963).
Jackie Henderson, 73, Scottish footballer.
Josie MacAvin, 85, Irish set director.
Charles Martin, 45, American NFL player, renal disease.
Cordelia Scaife May, 76, American philanthropist and heiress to Mellon family fortune, pancreatic cancer.

27
Gilbert Bennion, 106, Australian veteran, one of the last four surviving Australian veterans of World War I.
Eddie Burks, 73, American blues musician.
Donald Dempsey, Sr., American recording executive who helped launch Ozzy Osbourne and Merle Haggard, stroke.
Rado Lenček, 83, Slovene linguist and ethnologist.
Aurélie Nemours, 94, French painter.
Jonathan Welsh, 57, Canadian actor.

28
Karen Lancaume, (aka Karen Bach), 32, French adult film performer, overdosed on sleeping pills.
Artūras Barysas, 50, Lithuanian counter-culture actor, singer, photographer and filmmaker.
Trevor Billingham, 69, Australian athlete.
Barbara J. Bishop, 84, American Marine Corps officer.
Daniel Branca, 53, Argentinian Disney comic book artist, heart attack.
Jim Capaldi, 60, British rock musician and songwriter (Traffic), stomach cancer.
Lucien Carr, 79, American United Press International editor, bone cancer.
Henry Hainworth, 90, British diplomat.
Paul A. Partain, 58, American actor (The Texas Chain Saw Massacre), cancer.
Jacques Villeret, 53, French actor/comedian, internal hemorrhage.
Robert Vogel, 86, American lawyer and politician.

29
A. Owen Aldridge, 89, American academic.
Ron Feinberg, 72, American actor (A Boy and His Dog, Hulk Hogan's Rock 'n' Wrestling, The Centurions).
Eric Griffiths, 64, British guitarist in the musical group The Quarrymen, pancreatic cancer.
Ephraim Kishon, 80, Israeli satirist, dramatist, screenwriter and film director, apparent heart attack.
Žika Mitrović, 83, Serbian film director.
Bill Shadel, 96, American journalist.
Ron Tomme, 73, American soap opera actor.
Joan Tompkins, 89, American actress.

30
Mary Beck, 96, American politician.
Martyn Bennett, 33, Scottish Celtic musician, cancer.
Susan Bradshaw, 73, British pianist.
Sir Horace Law, 93, British admiral.

31
Ron Basford, 72, Canadian cabinet minister (1970s).
Nel Benschop, 87, Dutch poet.
Yutsuko Chūsonji, 42, Japanese manga artist, colorectal cancer.
Jack Collins, 86, American actor (The Towering Inferno, The Sting, Bewitched).
Malcolm Hardee, 55, British comedian, drowning.
Bobby Howitt, 79, Scottish football player and manager.
H. Narasimhaiah, 84, Indian physicist and educator.
Ivan Noble, 37, British BBC journalist, brain tumour.

References

2005-01
 01